Arnold (Nol) Maassen  (August 18, 1922 in Amsterdam - July 3, 2009 in Langon, France) was a Dutch politician for the Labour Party (PvdA).

Maassen was a member of the States-Provincial of North Holland from 1974 to 1981 and a member of the Senate from 1981 to 1987. As a Senator he was spokesman for development aid, and was known as an anti-nuclear weapon pacifist.

He also worked as an employee with the postal service PTT, where he was dealing with complaints.

References 
  Parlement.com biography

1922 births
2009 deaths
Dutch civil servants
Labour Party (Netherlands) politicians
Members of the Senate (Netherlands)
Members of the Provincial Council of North Holland
Politicians from Amsterdam
Dutch expatriates in France